Eleni Kakambouki (born 10 May 1987) is a Greek footballer who plays as a midfielder for Serie B  club Lazio and the Greece women's national team.

Career
Kakambouki has been capped for the Greece national team, appearing for the team during the 2019 FIFA Women's World Cup qualifying cycle.

Honours
PAOK
A Division(7): 2015,2016,2017,2018,2019,2020,2021
Greek Cup(3): 2015,2016,2017

References

External links
 
 
 

1987 births
Living people
Women's association football midfielders
Greek women's footballers
Greece women's international footballers
PAOK FC (women) players